Richard Lambart, 4th Earl of Cavan PC (I) (died 10 March 1742) was an Irish peer.

He was the second but eldest surviving son of Charles Lambart, 3rd Earl of Cavan, and Castilina Gilbert, daughter of Henry Gilbert of Kilminchy and sister of St Leger Gilbert MP. He inherited the Earldom of Cavan in 1702, his eldest brother Charles having predeceased their father.

He married Margaret Trant, daughter of  Richard Trant, Governor of Barbados, and had four children, including Ford Lambart, 5th Earl of Cavan, and Gertrude who married William Fitzmaurice, 2nd Earl of Kerry.

References

1742 deaths
Members of the Privy Council of Ireland
Year of birth unknown
Earls of Cavan